The Justice Social Democratic Party (ASDP) is a political party in Uzbekistan. One of the founders and the first general secretary of the party was Anvar Juraboev. It is one of the four parties who acts as a pro-government opposition to the Uzbekistan Liberal Democratic Party, the country's ruling party.

Ideology 
ASDP is a centre-left political party and holds positions similar to the People's Democratic Party of Uzbekistan. It promotes egalitarianism and social justice, supporting a social market economy and an universalistic welfare state. Its core supporters include workers in technical engineering, teachers, doctors, and employees in budgetary organizations and the sector of services.

Electoral history

Legislative Chamber elections

References

Sources

External links 
 

1995 establishments in Uzbekistan
Political parties established in 1995
Political parties in Uzbekistan
Social democratic parties